Senator Hodgson may refer to:

Dawson Hodgson (born 1978), Rhode Island State Senate
John Hodgson (Wisconsin politician) (1812–1869), Wisconsin State Senate